William "Willi" Mrazek (October 20, 1911 - February 8, 1992) was a German-American loads engineer and member of the "von Braun rocket group." Mrazek worked first at Peenemünde Army Research Center and later, through Operation Paperclip, at Fort Bliss and the Marshall Space Flight Center, where he was involved with the development of the Saturn V rocket.

Biography
Mrazek was born in 1911 in what was then Austria-Hungary. He graduated from Deutsche Technische Hochschule, where he earned his Dipl. Ing., in 1935. Mrazek spent some military time after graduation on the Eastern Front, where he received a saber wound to his face; following his injury, he began work at Peenemünde, which continued from 1941 to 1945.

In 1946, Mrazek was one of the engineers and scientists invited to the United States through Operation Paperclip, arriving with von Braun's team at Fort Bliss on April 8. The Marshall Space Flight Center employed Mrazek, naming him Director of Structures and Mechanics Division in 1960; by 1969, he held the position of Assistant Director for Engineering for Industrial Operations. Mrazek also reported to the Saturn V Project Manager as Chief Engineer for all development and fabrication work on the rocket from 1965 to 1970. While working on the Saturn V, Mrazek and his team clashed with American aviation companies who were subcontracted on the project. One such instance involved an argument with North American Aviation over internal loads in the rocket's S-II phase; North American was ultimately proven right, to Mrazek's consternation.

References and notes

External links
 William Mrazek Collection, The University of Alabama in Huntsville Archives and Special Collections
 Stages to Saturn History Project oral interview with Mrazek, part 1, part 2 and part 3, from The University of Alabama in Huntsville Oral History Collections
 Space History Interview with Ursula Mrazek Vann, Mrazek's daughter, from The University of Alabama in Huntsville Oral History Collections

American aerospace engineers
German aerospace engineers
German rocket scientists
1911 births
1992 deaths
People from Lukavac
Early spaceflight scientists
Peenemünde Army Research Center and Airfield
Marshall Space Flight Center
NASA people
Operation Paperclip
German emigrants to the United States